Megachile mitchelli is a species of bee in the family Megachilidae. It was described by Raw in 2004.

References

Mitchelli
Insects described in 2004